Neuilly-en-Sancerre is a commune in the Cher department in the Centre-Val de Loire region of France.

Geography

Population

Sights
 The church of St. Martial, dating from the twelfth century.
The remains of the donjon of a feudal castle.

See also
Communes of the Cher department

References

Communes of Cher (department)